Air Greece was an airline based in Heraklion, Greece. It was one of the first private airlines to operate scheduled domestic flights in Greece.

Code data
IATA Code: JG
ICAO Code: AGJ
Callsign: Air Greece

History

Air Greece was established in 1994 by Cretan businessmen and started operations in
the same year using two leased ATR72 turboprops on domestic routes. In April 1997
a third ATR72 was added to the fleet, followed by the lease of two Fokker 100s in May
and June 1999. Delivery of the Fokkers marked the international expansion of the
company and new routes to destinations in Germany were opened.

In 1999, passenger ferry company Minoan Lines acquired a 51% stake in Air
Greece. However, at that time Air Greece
was facing strong competition from Aegean Airlines, Cronus Airlines and
Olympic Airways, forcing it to begin a cooperation with Aegean which ended
in a full takeover by Aegean in December 1999.
During 2000, Air Greece's original owners made an unsuccessful attempt to
launch Cretan Airways as its successor.

Services

Air Greece operated scheduled services from/to the following cities:
Athens, Thessaloniki, Rhodes, Santorini, Araxos, Kavala, Mytilene, Ioannina and Chania.
International destinations:
Cologne, Stuttgart and Düsseldorf.

Fleet
The fleet of Air Greece consisted of the following aircraft:

3 ATR-72 turboprops. (SX-BAO/cn 326, SX-BAP/cn 330, SX-BFK/cn 313)
2 Fokker-100 jets. (SX-BGL/cn 11387, SX-BGM/cn 11476)

References

External links

Air Greece history from Airliners.gr
Air Greece fleet
Air Greece aircraft photos from Airliners.net

Defunct airlines of Greece
Airlines established in 1994
Airlines disestablished in 1999
1999 disestablishments in Greece
Greek companies established in 1994